The PB (English: Silent Pistol; GRAU index 6P9) is a Soviet integrally suppressed semi-automatic pistol developed and manufactured by the Izhevsk Mechanical Plant, based on the Makarov pistol; since the merger of the Izhevsk Mechanical Plant and the Izhevsk Machine-Building Plant to form the Kalashnikov Concern in 2013, the Kalashnikov Concern has continued to manufacture the PB. The weapon entered service in 1967.

Design and features
The PB uses an integral suppressor, which, unlike most similar systems, consists of two parts. This allows the pistol to be carried and kept concealed without the front section of the suppressor attached, and for the suppressor to be quickly deployed prior to use. The pistol may also be fired safely without the front section attached, which may be important in critical situations. When fired like this, the PB sounds similar to a regular Makarov pistol. The detached suppressor is carried in a special compartment of the holster, which was designed especially for the PB.

The PB's firing mechanism and design is based on that of the Makarov pistol. Because the front part of the barrel is covered by the suppressor, the slide is very short, such that it does not allow placing a return spring into it. For that reason, the spring is in the grip, and acts on the slide by means of a long lever.

The iron sights are fixed. It uses standard 8-round magazines from the Makarov pistol.

Users
  – Used for executions

Former users
  – Used by the KGB, Ministry of Internal Affairs special units (OMON) and Soviet Army reconnaissance groups

See also
APB suppressed machine pistol
List of modern Russian small arms and light weapons

References

External links
 ПБ 6П9 (video, in Russian)
 PB silenced - Modern Firearms
 Guns of the Spetsnaz – 9mm PB silenced pistol by Maxim Popenker

Silenced firearms
Semi-automatic pistols of the Soviet Union
9×18mm Makarov semi-automatic pistols